On August 2, 1813, at the end of the 1st session of the 13th Congress, Egbert Benson (F) of New York's  resigned.  A special election was held for his replacement December 28–30, 1813

Election results

Irving took his seat on January 22, 1814

See also
List of special elections to the United States House of Representatives

References

New York 1813 02
1813 02
New York 1813 02
New York 02
United States House of Representatives
United States House of Representatives 1813 02
August 1813 events